Karim Sadjadpour is an Iranian-American policy analyst at the Carnegie Endowment. Prior to that he was "chief Iran analyst" at the International Crisis Group. He is a contributor to BBC TV and radio, CNN, National Public Radio, PBS NewsHour and Al-Jazeera, and has also appeared on the Today Show, Charlie Rose, Fox News Sunday and the Colbert Report. He contributes regularly to publications such as the Economist, Washington Post, New York Times, International Herald Tribune and Foreign Policy.

Education 
Sadjadpour received a Bachelor of Arts at the University of Michigan, and an M.A. at Johns Hopkins School of Advanced International Studies.

Career 
He has briefed U.S., EU and Asian officials about Middle Eastern affairs, he testified before the US Congress, has lectured at Harvard, Princeton, and Stanford Universities. He is the recipient of a number of academic awards, including a Fulbright scholarship.
  
In 2007 Sadjadpour was named a Young Global Leader by the World Economic Forum in Davos. He is a board member of the Banu Foundation, an organization dedicated to assisting grassroots organizations that are empowering women worldwide.

Publications
 Reading Khamenei: The World View of Iran's Most Powerful Leader, Carnegie Endowment Report, March 2008 - New Foreword, December 2009

Footnotes

External links

American people of Iranian descent
Living people
University of Michigan alumni
Paul H. Nitze School of Advanced International Studies alumni
Year of birth missing (living people)
Fulbright alumni